Tesařík (feminine Tesaříková) is a Czech surname meaning "little carpenter", a diminutive of Tesař (carpenter). Notable people include:

 Dušan Tesařík, Czech footballer
 Richard Tesařík, Czech general
 Štěpán Tesařík, Czech athlete

Czech-language surnames
Occupational surnames